Aristotle of Stagira (384 BC–322 BC) was a Greek philosopher.

Aristotle may also refer to:

People with the given name
The modern Greek name is also anglicized Aristotelis; the French form is Aristote:
Aristotle of Cyrene (4th century BC), philosopher of the Cyrenaic school
Aristotle the Dialectician (3rd century BC), a philosopher who killed the tyrant Abantidas of Sicyon
Aristotle of Argos (3rd century BC), rebel who led a revolt against the rule of Cleomenes III in Argos
Aristotle of Mytilene (2nd century AD), Peripatetic philosopher in the time of Galen
Aristotele Fioravanti (–), Italian Renaissance architect and engineer
Aristotelis Valaoritis (1824–1879), Greek poet
Aristotle Onassis (1906–1975), Greek shipping magnate
Aristóteles Picho (1957–21 December 2013), Peruvian actor
Aristotelia Peloni, Greek journalist and politician in the Cabinet of Kyriakos Mitsotakis
Aristotle Athari, comedian and cast member on Saturday Night Live

Eponymy
Other things named "Aristotle" or "Aristoteles", after the philosopher:

Places
6123 Aristoteles, an asteroid
Aristoteles (crater), a crater on the Moon
Aristotelis (municipality), in Chalkidiki, Greece
Aristotle Lane, Oxford, England
Aristotle Mountains, Antarctica
Aristotle University of Thessaloniki, Greece
Platia Aristotelous (Aristotle Square), Thessaloniki, Greece

Works about Aristotle
Aristotle (painting), a 1637 painting by Jusepe de Ribera
Aristotle (Shields book), a 2007 book by Christopher Shields
Aristotle, a 1919 book by Alfred Edward Taylor
Aristotle, a 1923 translation by W. D. Ross

Other
Aristotle, Inc., a U.S. company which specializes in data-mining voter data
Aristotle (children's book), a 2003 children's book by Dick King-Smith
Aristotle (horse)
Aristotle, a character in The Addams Family
Aristotle Nostradamus "Bull" Shannon, character in the NBC TV series "Night Court" played by Richard Moll

See also
Aristotelian (disambiguation)
Aristotelianism
Peripatetic school
Pseudo-Aristotle
Aristo (disambiguation)
Ariston (disambiguation)
Aristotelia (moth)
Aristotelia (plant)